This is a list of Beninese writers.

Christine Adjahi Gnimagnon (1945– ), also connected with Senegal
Stanislas Adotevi (1934– ), French-language academic and philosopher 
Berte-Evelyne Agbo, French-language poet also connected with Senegal
Colette Senami Agossou Houeto (1939– )
Barbara Akplogan (1984– ), French-language writer
Julien Alapini (1906–1971), ethnographer and playwright 
Ryad Assani-Razaki (1981– ) 
Francis Aupiais (1877–1945), French-born missionary and anthropologist
Olympe Bhêly-Quenum (1928– ), writer and journalist 
Jérôme Carlos (1944– ), novelist, poet
Florent Couao-Zotti (1964– ), novelist, writer of comics, plays and short stories
Félix Couchoro (1900–1968), novelist, also connected with Togo  
Moudjib Djinadou (1965– ), novelist
Richard Dogbeh (1932–2003), also connected with Togo, Senegal and Côte d'Ivoire
Bazini Zakari Dramani (1940– ), academic and writer
Paul Fabo (1906–1973), journalist and playwright
Adelaide Fassinou (1955– ), novelist
Dieudonné Gnammankou (1963– ), writer and historian
Paul Hazoumé (1890–1980), novelist 
Gisèle Hountondji (1954– ), French-language novelist
Paulin J. Hountondji (1942– ), philosopher and politician
Béatrice Lalinon Gbado, children's writer
Rashidah Ismaili (1941– ), poet, fiction writer, essayist, playwright
Paulin Joachim (1931–2012), poet, journalist and editor
Lauryn, also connected with Côte d'Ivoire and Togo, born in France (1978– )
Barnabé Laye (1941– ), poet
Hortense Mayaba, French-language novelist and children's writer
Jean Pliya (1931–2015), playwright and short story writer
José Pliva (1966– ), actor and playwright
 Eustache Prudencio (1922–2001), journalist, writer and diplomat
Alidjanatou Saliou-Arekpa, French-language novelist
 Arnold Sènou, French-language novelist

See also
List of African writers

References

Beninese
Writers
Beninese